Nafrian is a village situated near Thimka in the district of Gujrat, Pakistan.

References

Villages in Gujrat District